In philosophy and the social sciences, social software is an interdisciplinary research program that borrows
mathematical tools and techniques from game theory and computer science in order to analyze and design social procedures. The goals of research in this field are modeling social situations, developing theories of correctness, and designing social procedures.

Work under the term social software has been going on since about 1996, and conferences in Copenhagen, London, Utrecht and New York, have been partly or wholly devoted to it. Much of the work is carried out at the City University of New York under the leadership of Rohit Jivanlal Parikh, who was influential in the development of the field.

Goals and tools 
Current research in the area of social software include the analysis of social procedures and examination of them for fairness, appropriateness, correctness and efficiency.  For example, an election procedure could be a simple majority vote, Borda count, a Single Transferable vote (STV), or Approval voting.  All of these procedures can be examined for various properties like monotonicity.  Monotonicity has the property that voting for a candidate should not harm that candidate.  This may seem obvious, true
under any system, but it is something which can happen in STV. Another question would be the ability to elect a Condorcet winner in case there is one.

Other principles which are considered by researchers in social software include the concept that a procedure for fair division should be Pareto optimal, equitable and envy free.  A procedure for auctions should be one which would encourage bidders to bid their actual valuation – a property which holds with the Vickrey auction.

What is new in social software compared to older fields is the use of tools from computer science like program logic, analysis of algorithms and epistemic logic. Like programs, social procedures dovetail into each other. For instance an airport provides runways for planes to land, but it also provides security checks, and it must provide for ways in which buses and taxis can take arriving passengers to their local destinations. The entire mechanism can be analyzed in the way in which a complex computer program can be analyzed. The Banach-Knaster procedure for dividing a cake fairly, or the Brams and Taylor procedure for fair division have been analyzed in this way. To point to the need for epistemic logic, a building not only needs restrooms, for obvious reasons, it also needs signs indicating where they are.  Thus epistemic considerations enter in addition to structural ones. For a more urgent example, in addition to medicines, physicians also need tests to indicate what a patient's problem is.

See also
 Dynamic logic
 Epistemic logic
 Fair division
 Game theory
 Mechanism design
 No-trade theorem
 Social procedure
 Social technology

Notes

Further reading 
 John Searle, The Construction of Social Reality (1995)  New York : Free Press, c1995.
 Rohit Parikh, “Social Software,” Synthese, 132, Sep 2002, 187–211.
 Eric Pacuit and Rohit Parikh,  "Social Interaction, Knowledge, and Social Software", in  Interactive Computation: The New Paradigm, ed.  Dina Goldin, Sott Smolka, Peter Wegner, Springer 2007, 441–461.
 Ludwig Wittgenstein, Philosophical Investigations, Macmillan, 1953.
 Jaakko Hintikka, Knowledge and Belief: an introduction to the logic of the two notions, Cornell University press, 1962, 
 D. Lewis, Convention, a Philosophical Study, Harvard U. Press, 1969.
 R. Aumann, Agreeing to disagree, Annals of Statistics, 4 (1976) 1236–1239.
 
 J. Geanakoplos and H. Polemarchakis, We Can't Disagree Forever, J. Economic Theory, 28 (1982), 192–200.
 R. Parikh and P. Krasucki, Communication, Consensus and Knowledge, J. Economic Theory 52 (1990) pp. 178–189.
 W. Brian Arthur. Inductive reasoning and bounded rationality. Complexity in Economic Theory, 84(2):406-411, 1994.
 Ronald Fagin, Joseph Halpern, Yoram Moses and Moshe Vardi, Reasoning about Knowledge, MIT Press 1995.
 Steven Brams and Alan Taylor, The Win-Win Solution: guaranteeing fair shares to everybody, Norton 1999.
 David Harel, Dexter Kozen and Jerzy Tiuryn, Dynamic Logic, MIT Press, 2000.
 Michael Chwe, Rational ritual : culture, coordination, and common knowledge,  Princeton University Press, 2001.
 Marc Pauly, Logic for Social Software, Ph.D. Thesis, University of Amsterdam. ILLC Dissertation Series 2001–10, .
 Rohit Parikh, Language as social software, in  Future Pasts: the Analytic Tradition in Twentieth Century Philosophy, Ed. J. Floyd and S. Shieh, Oxford U. Press, 2001, 339–350.
 Parikh, R. and Ramanujam, R., A knowledge based semantics of messages, in J. Logic, Language, and Information, 12, pp. 453 – 467, 2003.
 Eric Pacuit,  Topics in Social Software: Information in Strategic Situations, Doctoral dissertation, City University of New York (2005).
 Eric Pacuit, Rohit Parikh and Eva Cogan, The Logic of Knowledge Based Obligation, Knowledge, Rationality and Action, a subjournal of Synthese, 149(2), 311 – 341, 2006.
 Eric Pacuit and Rohit Parikh, Reasoning about Communication Graphs, in Interactive Logic, Edited by Johan van Benthem, Dov Gabbay and Benedikt Lowe (2007).
 Mike Wooldridge, Thomas Ågotnes, Paul E. Dunne, and Wiebe van der Hoek. Logic for Automated Mechanism Design – A Progress Report. In Proceedings of the Twenty-Second Conference on Artificial Intelligence (AAAI-07), Vancouver, Canada, July 2007.

External links 
Knowledge, Games and Beliefs Group. City University of New York, Graduate Center.
Social Software conference. Carlsberg Academy, Copenhagen. May 27–29, 2004. Retrieved on 2009-06-26.
Interactive Logic: Games and Social Software workshop. King's College, London. November 4–7, 2005. Retrieved on 2009-06-26.
 Games, action and social software workshop. Lorentz Center, Leiden University, Netherlands. 30 Oct 2006–3 Nov 2006. Retrieved on 2009-06-26.
 Social Software Mini-conference. Knowledge, Games and Beliefs Group, City University of New York. May 18–19, 2007. Retrieved on 2009-06-26.

Game theory
Logic